Veterans Against the War may refer to:
 Iraq Veterans Against the War
 Vietnam Veterans Against the War

See also
 Veterans for Peace